Ayesha Rosena Anna McGowan (born April 2, 1987) is an American professional racing cyclist who currently rides for UCI Women's World Team . She is also an activist and advocate aiming to improve diversity and inclusivity in cycling, especially for women and ethnic minorities. She is the first African American woman on a professional road cycling team.

Early life and amateur career 
Unlike many professional cyclists who begin racing competitively at a young age, McGowan only started cycling as a commuter student at the Berklee College of Music in Boston. After graduation in 2010, she moved to Brooklyn, where she worked as a daycare teacher and taught private music lessons for five years.

After seven years of commuting, McGowan made her racing debut at the 2014 Red Hook Crit in Brooklyn, the first edition to feature separate men's and women's races. Later that same year, she took her maiden victory in the Category 4 race at the New York State Criterium Championships in White Plains.

Professional career 
In 2019, McGowan made her UCI professional-level racing debut when she competed in the Joe Martin Stage Race and in the Colorado Classic. On the third stage of the Colorado Classic, her attacking efforts garnered her significant attention and won her the Most Inspirational jersey for that stage.

This allowed her to make her racing debut with the team after August 1, as per UCI regulations. This debut came in early September, when McGowan was selected for the Tour Cycliste Féminin International de l'Ardèche. McGowan featured in the winning breakaway on stage 6, placing seventh, before eventually finishing 50th overall.

References

External links 
 

1987 births
African-American sportswomen
American female cyclists
Living people
Sportspeople from Atlanta
21st-century African-American sportspeople
20th-century African-American people
20th-century African-American women
21st-century African-American women
Cyclists from Georgia (U.S. state)